The 495th Bombardment Squadron is an inactive United States Air Force unit.  Its last was assigned to the 344th Bombardment Group, stationed at Schleissheim Palace, Germany.  It was inactivated on 15 February 1946.

History
Activated in late 1942 as a III Bomber Command Replacement Training Unit.   In late 1943, realigned as an operational squadron, deployed to European Theater of Operations in February 1944.  Assigned to IX Bomber Command in 1944.   Engaged in tactical bombardment of enemy targets in Occupied Europe initially from stations in England, then after D-Day, moved to Advanced Landing Grounds in France and Belgium; advancing eastward as Allied ground forces advanced.   Supported Eighth Air Force strategic bombardment missions over Nazi Germany and Occupied Europe; striking enemy airfields to obtain maximum interference in Luftwaffe day interceptor attacks on heavy bomber formations returning to England.  Also participated in Western Allied Invasion of Germany, March–April 1945, combat ending with German Capitation in May 1945.

Squadron remained in Germany as part of the United States Air Forces in Europe occupation fores.   Personnel demobilized in Germany and squadron inactivated on 15 February 1946.

Lineage
 Constituted 495th Bombardment Squadron (Medium) on 31 August 1942
 Activated on 8 September 1942
 Inactivated on 30 December 1945

Assignments
 344th Bombardment Group, 8 September 1942 – 30 December 1945

Stations
 MacDill Field, Florida, 8 September 1942
 Drane Field, Florida, 28 December 1942
 Hunter Field, Georgia, 19 December 1943- 26 January 1944
 RAF Stansted Mountfitchet (AAF-169), England, 9 February 1944
 Cormeilles-en-Vexin Airfield (A-59), France, 30 September 1944
 Florennes/Juzaine Airfield (A-78), Belgium, 5 April 1945
 Schleissheim Palace, Germany, 15 September 1945 – 15 February 1946 (Ground Echelon)

Aircraft
 B-26 Marauder, 1942–1945

References

 

Bombardment squadrons of the United States Army Air Forces
Military units and formations established in 1942